Letters to a Young Brother is a book written by actor Hill Harper, published April 2006.

Harper wrote the book to help young black males get through life and not make the same mistakes he made at a certain age. The book was inspired by Ranier Maria Rilke's Letters to a Young Poet.

References

Self-help books
African-American culture